Erigone dentosa is a species of dwarf spider in the family Linyphiidae. It is found in a range from the United States to Guatemala and has been introduced into Belgium.

References

Linyphiidae
Articles created by Qbugbot
Spiders described in 1894